German submarine U-517 was a Type IXC U-boat of the Nazi Germany's Kriegsmarine during World War II.

She was laid down at the Deutsche Werft in Hamburg as yard number 313 on 5 June 1941, launched on 30 December 1941 and commissioned on 21 March 1942 with Kapitänleutnant Paul Hartwig in command.

U-517 began her service career with training as part of the 4th U-boat Flotilla from 21 March 1942. She was reassigned to the 10th flotilla for operations on 1 September.

She carried out two patrols and sank eight ships. She was sunk by British carrier aircraft on 21 November 1942.

Design
German Type IXC submarines were slightly larger than the original Type IXBs. U-517 had a displacement of  when at the surface and  while submerged. She had two shafts and two  propellers.

U-517 was fitted with six  torpedo tubes (four fitted at the bow and two at the stern), 22 torpedoes, one  SK C/32 naval gun, 180 rounds, and a  SK C/30 as well as a  C/30 anti-aircraft gun. The boat had a complement of forty-eight.

Service history

First patrolBlair, p. 685-687
The boat departed Kiel on 8 August 1942, moved through the North Sea and negotiated the gap between Iceland and the Faroe Islands. She crossed the Atlantic Ocean and attacked Allied shipping in the area of the Gulf of St. Lawrence. Two other type IXC boats  and  left Kiel at about the same time to patrol the same area. These boats were to check if North Atlantic convoys were diversing North, through Canadian waters. to avoid the U-boat packs patrolling in the North Atlantic.

On 27 August the U-517 makes contact with the fast section of convoy SG-6 and sinks the troop transport Chatham, whilst the U-165 attacks the other section of the convoy. On 28 August U-517 finishes off the freighter Arlyn which was damaged earlier by U-165.

U-517 and U-165 move further inland into the St Lawrence river in search of assembly areas of convoys but find nothing. Only on 3 September the U-517 found 2 coastal convoys NL-6 and LN-7. From convoy NL-6, the U-517 sank the Donald Stewart northeast of Cape Whittle. The Canadian escort  tried to ram, but the distance between the two vessels was too great. U-517 then evaded a depth charge pattern. A few hours later, she was attacked by a Digby aircraft of No. 10 Squadron RCAF; but the depth charges detonated prematurely, causing more damage to the aircraft than to the U-boat.

On 7 September, U-517 was able to sink 3 ships out of convoy QS-33, which was detected and attacked by U-165 the day before.

On 15 September U-517 finds the convoy SQ-36 and sinks 2 ships out of that convoy. She brings up U-165 which can also attack and damage 2 ships.

U-517 has no further success in attacks on subsequent convoys and evades on 21 September a ramming attack by the minesweeper Georgian which is part of the convoy escort for SQ-38

U-517 docked at Lorient in occupied France on 19 October 1942.

Second patrol and loss
The boat departed Lorient on 17 November 1942 and sailed west. She was hardly out of the Bay of Biscay when she was sunk by Fairey Albacores of 817 Naval Air Squadron from the aircraft carrier  on 21 November 1942.

One man died; there were 52 survivors.

Summary of raiding history

References

Notes

Citations

Bibliography

External links

German Type IX submarines
U-boats commissioned in 1942
U-boats sunk in 1942
World War II submarines of Germany
1941 ships
World War II shipwrecks in the Atlantic Ocean
Ships built in Hamburg
U-boats sunk by British aircraft
U-boats sunk by depth charges
Maritime incidents in November 1942